Fermi–Walker transport is a process in general relativity used to define a coordinate system or reference frame such that all curvature in the frame is due to the presence of mass/energy density and not to arbitrary spin or rotation of the frame.

Fermi–Walker differentiation

In the theory of Lorentzian manifolds, Fermi–Walker differentiation is a generalization of covariant differentiation. In general relativity, Fermi–Walker derivatives of the spacelike vector fields in a frame field, taken with respect to the timelike unit vector field in the frame field, are used to define non-inertial and non-rotating frames, by stipulating that the Fermi–Walker derivatives should vanish. In the special case of inertial frames, the Fermi–Walker derivatives reduce to covariant derivatives.

With a  sign convention, this is defined for a vector field X along a curve :

If

 

then the vector field  is Fermi–Walker transported along the curve. Vectors perpendicular to the space of four-velocities in Minkowski spacetime, e.g., polarization vectors, under Fermi–Walker transport experience Thomas precession.

Using the Fermi derivative, the Bargmann–Michel–Telegdi equation for spin precession of electron in an external electromagnetic field can be written as follows:

The right side describes Larmor precession.

Co-moving coordinate systems

A coordinate system co-moving with a particle can be defined. If we take the unit vector  as defining an axis in the co-moving coordinate system, then any system transforming with proper time is said to be undergoing Fermi Walker transport.

Generalised Fermi–Walker differentiation

Fermi–Walker differentiation can be extended for any , this is defined for a vector field  along a curve :

where .  

If , then  

 and

See also
Basic introduction to the mathematics of curved spacetime
Enrico Fermi
Transition from Newtonian mechanics to general relativity

Notes

References 
.

Kocharyan A.A. (2004). Geometry of Dynamical Systems. arXiv:astro-ph/0411595.

Mathematical methods in general relativity